The List of United Kingdom Speedway League Champions is split into three divisions, the top tier, the second tier and third tier, all three divisions have been known in various guises such as National League, Premier League, Elite League and many more. This list gives a complete listing of the divisional winners for each season.

During some years there was only one or two divisions.

Belle Vue hold the most tier one championships with 13 followed by Poole with 10.

Tier One League (Top division)

Most Tier One titles

Tier Two League (Second division)

Tier Three League (Third division)

References

Speedway in the United Kingdom